The 1920–21 Colgate Raiders men's basketball team represented Colgate University during the 1920–21 college men's basketball season. The head coach was William Reid, coaching the Raiders in his second season. The team had finished with an overall record of 16–6. The team captain was Nels Anderson.

Schedule

|-

References

Colgate Raiders men's basketball seasons
Colgate
Colgate
Colgate